Habung is a historical region in present-day Lakhimpur district of Assam, India, although some Tai-ahom activists claim it to be a part of present-day Dhemaji district. According to Wade (1800), the region where the Subansiri river and the Brahmaputra rivers met was known as Habung.As per epigrahic records, Habung (Ha-vrnga-Vishaya) was a vishaya or province where Brahmins were settled by Ratna Pala of the Pala dynasty of Kamarupa in the 10th century.

History

Early history
The earliest reference to Habung comes in the 10th century copper plate grant of Ratnapala of the Pala dynasty, when it was a province (visaya) of the Kamarupa Kingdom with Brahmin settlements.  

It is known that Sukaphaa, the Ahom king, spent a few years in Habung before finally settling down at Charaideo in 1253.

Medieval period
The oldest copperplates of land grants (found till date) made in this region are those by the Chutia kings, that date back to the year 1392 AD when king Satyanarayan donated 600 puti of land to a Brahman named Narayan Dwij at Dhenukhana. This was the time when the Ahom prince Sudangphaa was still living with his Brahmin foster family at Habung. The copper plate of Chutia king Dharmanarayan dated 1428 A.D. mentions Sri Vrihat-patra as Habung-aadhipati (lord of Habung). The plate records land grants of 400 puti given to a Brahmin named Purandar Vipra, indicating that Habung was a principality of the Chutia kingdom.

Suhungmung, the Ahom king, following an expansionist policy and annexed Panbari of Habung in 1512 AD, which was a part of the Chutia kingdom. The Chutia king Dhirnarayan attacked the Ahoms at Dikhoumukh the next year, but was unsuccessful. The Chutias again attacked the Ahoms in 1520 and occupied the areas up to Namdang and Mungkhrang. 

The last copperplate recording a grant made in the region was issued by king Dhirnarayan in 1522 A.D. at a place known as Konwargaon (present-day Dhakuakhana) after which the region was finally annexed by the Ahom king Suhungmung in 1523 A.D.

Popular culture

The Habung region finds mention in several folk songs and tales. For instance, there is a Nisukoni geet(a form of lullaby) where the author talks about an old man(Habungia Burha) and a carpenter(Habungia Barhoi) from Habung.

Notes

References

 

	
 
 

History of Assam
Dhemaji
Ahom kingdom